Antoine Creek may refer to:

Antoine Creek (Louisiana)
the Antoine River]. a tributary of the Little Missouri River in Montana, United States
Antoine Creek (British Columbia), a tributary of the Bridge River in British Columbia, Canada
Antoine Creek (Cariboo), a creek flowing into Antoine Lake near Horsefly, British Columbia, Canada
Antoine Louis Creek, a creek in the Spatsizi Plateau region of British Columbia, Canada
Antoine Creek (Ontario), a creek in Frontenac and Lanark Counties, Ontario, Canada
Antoine Creek (Nipissing), a creek in Nipissing County, Ontario, Canada